In enzymology, a triglucosylalkylacylglycerol sulfotransferase is an enzyme that catalyzes the chemical reaction

3'-phosphoadenylyl sulfate + α-D-glucosyl-(1→6)-alpha-D-glucosyl-(1→6)-α-D-glucosyl-(1→3)-1-O-alkyl-2-O-acylglycerol  adenosine 3',5'-bisphosphate + 6-sulfo-α-D-glucosyl-(1→6)-α-D-glucosyl-(1→6)-α-D-glucosyl-(1→3)-1-O-alkyl-2-O-acylglycerol

This enzyme belongs to the family of transferases, specifically the sulfotransferases, which transfer sulfur-containing groups.  The systematic name of this enzyme class is 3'-phosphoadenylyl-sulfate:triglucosyl-1-O-alkyl-2-O-acylglycerol 6-sulfotransferase. This enzyme is also called triglucosylmonoalkylmonoacyl sulfotransferase.

References

 

EC 2.8.2
Enzymes of unknown structure